is a Japanese voice actress formerly affiliated with Toritori Office. She is represented by Tokyo Actor's Consumer's Cooperative Society.

Biography
In an interview with Repotama, Tanezaki revealed she watched Sailor Moon. She explained that her job was impactful and she became an actress. She had part-time jobs after attending high school in Ōita Prefecture. In an interview, she stated that her favorite voice actresses are Miyuki Sawashiro and Mayumi Tanaka. Tanezaki attended the concert and had the opportunity from Junko Iwao. Upon expressing her desire about a fan event, Iwao responded stating that she would work with her. In 2020, Tanezaki won the Best Supporting Actress Award at the 14th Seiyu Awards. In 2023, she was a recipient of the Best Supporting Actor Award and Best Lead Actor Award at the 17th Seiyu Awards.

Filmography

Anime series
2012
My Little Monster as Asako Natsume
Place to Place as girl student

2013
Da Capo III as Jill Hathaway
Day Break Illusion as Itsuki Tendo, Mutsumi Tendo, Nanase Tendo
DD Fist of the North Star as housewife B, female, Toshi
DokiDoki! PreCure as female student, club member
Ojarumaru as schoolgirl, OL, customer, Kawaikoharu, Arumi
Samurai Flamenco as boy, maid, woman A
Silver Spoon as Minami Kitamachi, announcer
WataMote as female student

2014
A Good Librarian Like a Good Shepherd as Nagi Kodachi
Hozuki's Coolheadedness as Karashi
In Search of the Lost Future as Yaeko Azuma
Magic Kaito 1412 as Keiko Momoi
Noragami as artifact
Ojarumaru as schoolgirl, housewife, xylophone, ten thousands steps trick
Silver Spoon 2 as vice president, woman B
Terror in Resonance as Lisa Mishima
Tribe Cool Crew as Ayumu Itou
World Conquest Zvezda Plot as schoolgirl B, Shabadaba commander 
Wolf Girl and Black Prince as Miho

2015
Death Parade as Mayu Arita
Durarara!! x2 Shou as Emilia, Yuigadokusonmaru
Gangsta. as Mikhail
Monster Musume as Lilith
Seraph of the End as Sayuri Hanayori
The Perfect Insider as Moe Nishinosono

2016
Mysterious Joker 3rd Season as Hosshii
High School Fleet as Mei Irizaki
Mob Psycho 100 as Tome Kurata
Nameko: Sekai no Tomodachi as Love Nameko
Servamp as Otogiri
Keijo as Ayase Kurogiri
Sound! Euphonium 2 as Mizore Yoroizuka

2017
A Centaur's Life as Chigusa Mitama, Chinami Mitama, Chiho Mitama
Blend S as Miu Amano
Land of the Lustrous as Neptunite
Nora, Princess, and Stray Cat as Yuuki Asuhara
The Ancient Magus' Bride as Chise Hatori

2018
Double Decker! Doug & Kirill as Yuri Fujishiro/"Robot"
Gakuen Babysitters as Kazuma Mamizuka
Ninja Girl & Samurai Master 3rd Season as Chiyome Mochizuki
How Not to Summon a Demon Lord as Klem
Harukana Receive as Claire Thomas
Rascal Does Not Dream of Bunny Girl Senpai as Rio Futaba

2019
Bakugan: Battle Planet as Veronica Venegas
Beastars as Juno
Circlet Princess as Chikage Fujimura
Endro! as Female Knight
Fairy Gone as Lily Heineman
Fruits Basket as Arisa Uotani
Granbelm as Shingetsu Ernesta Fukami
Kandagawa Jet Girls as Minato Tsuruno
Kono Oto Tomare! Sounds of Life as Satowa Hōzuki
Val × Love as Skuld
W'z as Hana

2020
A Certain Scientific Railgun T as Ryouko Kuriba, and Doppelganger
Bakugan: Armored Alliance as Veronica Venegas 
Dragon Quest: The Adventure of Dai as Dai
Fruits Basket 2nd Season as Arisa Uotani
Monster Girl Doctor as Skadi Dragenfelt
Shadowverse as Kai Ijūin

2021
Beastars Season 2 as Juno
Demon Slayer: Kimetsu no Yaiba – Entertainment District Arc as Hinatsuru
Dr. Stone: Stone Wars as Nikki Hanada
Horimiya as Miki Yoshikawa
Joran: The Princess of Snow and Blood as Rinko Takemichi
That Time I Got Reincarnated as a Slime 2nd Season as Mjurran
The Honor Student at Magic High School as Shiori Kanō
The Promised Neverland Season 2 as Mujika
Vivy: Fluorite Eye's Song as Vivy

2022
Arknights: Prelude to Dawn as Dobermann
Beast Tamer as Leanne
Mob Psycho 100 III as Tome Kurata
My Dress-Up Darling as Sajuna Inui
Nights with a Cat as Pi-chan
Princess Connect! Re:Dive Season 2 as Chloe
Shin Ikki Tousen as Asaemon Yamada
Shine Post as Eiko Kikuchi
Spy × Family as Anya Forger

2023 
Bosanimal as Ran
Dead Mount Death Play as Lisa Kuraki
Frieren as Frieren
Heavenly Delusion as Aoshima
My Clueless First Friend as Yukiko Takada
My Hero Academia Season 6 as Kaina Tsutsumi / Lady Nagant
Nier: Automata Ver1.1a as Lily
The Ancient Magus' Bride 2nd Season as Chise Hatori
The Dangers in My Heart as Serina Yoshida
The Iceblade Sorcerer Shall Rule the World as Lydia Ainsworth
Tomo-chan Is a Girl! as Ogawa
Unnamed Memory as Tinasha
Yomawari Neko as Jūrō

Original video animation 
2013
Kamisama Kiss as Tanuko
My Little Monster as Asako Natsume
2016
The Ancient Magus' Bride: Those Awaiting a Star as Chise Hatori
2018
Thus Spoke Kishibe Rohan as Naoko Osato (ep. 2)
2021
The Ancient Magus' Bride: The Boy From the West and the Knight of the Mountain Haze as Chise Hatori
Alice Gear Aegis: Doki! Actress Darake no Mermaid Grand Prix as Sugumi Kanagata

Original net animation
Hana no Zundamaru (2013)
Dohiwai Senior Protection Club (2014) as Marie
Chuuko Video-ya no Onna Tenin X (2016) as Inari
JoJo's Bizarre Adventure: Stone Ocean (2021–22) as Emporio Alniño
Pokémon Evolutions (2021) as Malva
The Missing 8 (2021) as Maesarc
Exception (2022) as Patty

Anime films
Persona 3 The Movie: No. 1, Spring of Birth (2013) as Natsuki Moriyama
Sound! Euphonium: The Movie – Welcome to the Kitauji High School Concert Band (2016) as Brass band member
Pop In Q (2016) as Konatsu Tomodate
Fireworks (2017) as Reporter
Servamp -Alice in the Garden- (2018) as Otogiri
Liz and the Blue Bird (2018) as Mizore Yoroizuka
Yo-kai Watch: Forever Friends as Jack Cobbler 
Grisaia: Phantom Trigger the Animation (2019) as Murasaki
Rascal Does Not Dream of a Dreaming Girl (2019) as Rio Futaba
Her Blue Sky (2019) as Chika Ōtaki
High School Fleet: The Movie (2020) as Mei Irizaki
Mobile Suit Gundam: Hathaway's Flash (2021) as Mace Flower
Rascal Does Not Dream of a Sister Venturing Out (2023) as Rio Futaba

Video games
Da Capo III as Jill Hathaway, Yoshiyuki Sakurai (child)
Himawari -Pebble in The Sky-
Overwatch as Orisa
Ren'ai 0 Kilometer Portable as Yura Yazaki
School of Talent: SUZU-ROUTE as Haru Kato
Tayutama: Kiss on my Deity
Fire Emblem Echoes: Shadows of Valentia as Faye (Known as Efie in Japan)The Idolmaster Cinderella Girls as Kyoko IgarashiFate/Grand Order as Ophelia PhamrsoloneHoshi Ori Yume Mirai as Ousaka SoraTsujidou-san no Jun'ai Road as Tanaka HanakoMaitetsu as HachirokuXenoblade Chronicles 2 as AgateAlice Gear Aegis as Sugumi KanagataNora to Oujo to Noraneko Heart as Asuhara YuukiAlphadia Series as Enah Alphadia Genesis Series as Enah/ElizeNora, Princess, and Stray Cat as Yuki AsuharaAzur Lane as Albacore, Zara, Pola, Jeanne d'ArcSdorica as Karen Arla FernandezKirara Fantasia as Amano MiuArknights as Blue Poison, DobermannPrincess Connect! Re:Dive as Hanako Kuroe/ChloeGranblue Fantasy as Vikala, Kai IjūinYuki Yuna is a Hero: Hanayui no Kirameki as Suzume KagajouSabbat of the Witch as Ayachi NeneSenren * Banka as Liechtenauer LenaRiddle Joker as Mitsukasa Ayase9-Nine- Series as Niimi SoraGirls' Frontline as Webley, KAC-PDW 13 Sentinels: Aegis Rim as Iori Fuyusaka, Chihiro MorimuraMagia Record as Sae KirinoValkyrie Connect as Divine Creator KamimusubiMaglam Lord as SatyusAlchemy Stars as BerylStar Ocean: The Divine Force as ElenaDusk Diver 2 as Le ViadaFinal Fantasy XIV: Endwalker as MeteionCounter:Side as Karin WongXenoblade Chronicles 3 as EthelZenless Zone Zero as Anby DemaraGate of Nightmares as MeruruCookie Run: Kingdom as Black Pearl CookieWitch on the Holy Night as Lugh Beowulf

DubbingNoelle as Noelle Kringle (Anna Kendrick)Hawkeye as Kate Bishop (Hailee Steinfeld)The Last Summoner as DoraRambo: Last Blood (2022 BS Tokyo edition) (Gabriela Beltran (Yvette Monreal))

OthersZephyr as Kal's sister (event anime)Mahou Shoujo Ikusei Keikaku Dreamland as Snow White (Drama CD)Hanikami, Kanojo wa Koi o Suru ～ Hana Mihen'' as Neru Shiduki (Drama CD)

References

External links
Official agency profile 

21st-century Japanese actresses
Japanese video game actresses
Japanese voice actresses
Living people
Seiyu Award winners
Tokyo Actor's Consumer's Cooperative Society voice actors
Voice actresses from Ōita Prefecture
Year of birth missing (living people)